Nefrusy was an ancient Egyptian city which location is north of modern day cities of El Ashmunein and El Quseyya. It is known for being the site of Battle of Nefrusy between the forces of Kamose and Hyksos forces, which saw the first attested use of chariots in the history of Military of ancient Egypt.

History

Nefrusy is first attested in a tomb at Hebenu in the Old Kingdom where Hathor, mistress of Nefrusy is mentioned. In the Middle Kingdom, the place is mentioned several times in the tombs of Beni Hassan where Hathor, lady of Nefrusy is also mentioned. Hetepet, consort of the nomarch Amenemhet was a priestess of Hathor of Nefrusy.
Under Teti son of Pepi, Nefrusy is described in the victory stela of Kamose as a 'nest of Asiatics'. Kamose destroyed Nefrusy on his campaign against the Hyksos. Another mayors resided there in the New Kingdom, Iuno, Mahu, Iamunefer, Pahahauti are known by name.

Hieroglyphic Descriptor

Modern Location  

See also
 List of ancient Egyptian towns and cities

References

Bibliography 
Wilkinson, Toby. The Rise and Fall of Ancient Egypt. Random House, New York, 2010. 
Ryholt, Kim SB. The Political Situation in Egypt during the Second Intermediate Period. Carsten Niebuhr Institute Publications, Copenhagen, 1997.  

Cities in ancient Egypt
Lost ancient cities and towns
Former populated places in Egypt
Archaeological sites in Egypt